Tan Aik Quan (born 27 October 1990) is a Malaysian badminton player who competes in the doubles category. He reached a career high as world number 15 in the mixed doubles partnered with Lai Pei Jing.

Achievements

Southeast Asian Games 
Mixed doubles

BWF Grand Prix 
The BWF Grand Prix had two levels, the Grand Prix and Grand Prix Gold. It was a series of badminton tournaments sanctioned by the Badminton World Federation (BWF) and played between 2007 and 2017.

Mixed doubles

  BWF Grand Prix Gold tournament
  BWF Grand Prix tournament

BWF International Challenge/Series 
Mixed doubles

  BWF International Challenge tournament
  BWF International Series tournament

References 

Living people
1990 births
People from Kedah
Malaysian sportspeople of Chinese descent
Malaysian male badminton players
Competitors at the 2013 Southeast Asian Games
Competitors at the 2015 Southeast Asian Games
Southeast Asian Games bronze medalists for Malaysia
Southeast Asian Games medalists in badminton
21st-century Malaysian people